In decision theory, competitive regret is the relative regret compared to an oracle with limited or unlimited power in the process of distribution estimation.

Competitive regret to the oracle with full power

Consider estimating a discrete probability distribution  on a discrete set  based on data , the regret of an estimator  is defined as

where  is the set of all possible probability distribution, and

Competitive regret to the oracle with limited power

Oracle with partial information

Given a partition  of the parameter space, and suppose the oracle knows the subset  where the true . The oracle will have regret as

The competitive regret to the oracle will be

Oracle with partial information

The oracle knows exactly , but can only choose the estimator among natural estimators. A natural estimator assigns equal probability to the symbols which appear the same number of time in the sample. The regret of the oracle is

and the competitive regret is

Example

For the estimator  proposed in Acharya et al.(2013),

Here  denotes the k-dimensional unit simplex surface.

References

Game theory